Korede Yemi Adedoyin (born 14 November 2000) is a Nigerian professional footballer who plays for Accrington Stanley as a winger.

Career
Born in Lagos, Adedoyin began his career with Everton at the age of 10, and moved on loan to Hamilton Academical in July 2019. He returned to Everton in January 2020. On 25 June 2020 it was announced that he would leave the club when his contract expired on 30 June 2020.

In September 2020 he signed for Sheffield Wednesday following a trial period. He suffered a hamstring injury during his first season. He made his senior debut against Newcastle United U21 in the EFL Trophy on the 31 August 2021, coming on as a second half substitute to replace Sylla Sow.

On 1 February 2022, it was confirmed that Adedoyin had joined Accrington Stanley on a permanent deal.

Career statistics

References

2000 births
Living people
Nigerian footballers
Everton F.C. players
Hamilton Academical F.C. players
Sheffield Wednesday F.C. players
Accrington Stanley F.C. players
Association football forwards